Weichsel may refer to:
 Vistula river (Weichsel in German)
 Weichselian glaciation
 Peter Weichsel (born 1943), American bridge player